Cheboksary Physics and Mathematics School — special boarding school in the Chuvash State University.

Location: 24, str. Urukova, Cheboksary, Chuvash Republic, RSFSR.

Now closed.

Overview
For the school selected the best trained in physics and math students of the Chuvash Republic, graduated seven classes. In school education took place in 8-10 grades.

Graduated in physics and mathematics school came to study at universities in Moscow, Leningrad, Cheboksary, Kazan and other cities, also in the military academies.

School students won prizes at national, zonal competitions in physics, mathematics and chemistry.

History
The school was opened in 1968 near the Chuvash University. Founder of the school was Egorov, he died in 1971. He was a man who cared exclusively for the Chuvash people.

In 1981 the school closed. The school was closed due to a change in the school's management, squabbles in the Ministry of education of Chuvashia and among teachers of the city of Cheboksary, as well as due to the dropping number of children in villages and towns, and a General drop in the birth rate in rural areas.

Then, in place of boarding school works Teacher Training College, now it is a Children's art school.

Reunion
Meeting of graduates of the school is held annually the first Saturday in August. Gathering place - the courtyard of the school.

See also
 Alikovo middle school
 Chuvash State Academic Song and Dance Ensemble
 Chuvash State Symphony Capella

References

External links
 Чебоксарская физмат школа-интернат №2 с углубленным изучением физики и математики

Middle schools
Schools in Russia
Cheboksary
Boarding schools in Russia